Attachai Fairtex (อรรถชัย แฟร์เท็กซ์) is a 3 time Muay Thai World Champion. With 200 professional Muay Thai fights  and a 90%-win record (180-15-5), he has been voted as one of the greatest fighters of his era by Thai media. Attachai Fairtex is a certified Muay Thai instructor from the Fairtex Camp  in Thailand and has taught in various gyms in Thailand, America  and Singapore. He now runs his own gym in Thailand – Attachai Muay Thai Gym.

Biography

Early life
Attachai was born in Rattanaburi, a poor village in the province of Surin. Muay Thai was a means for him to bring money home for his family. He started training at the age of 8. Muay Thai runs in Attachai's family and his cousin, Chaiya Sor Supawan, was also a champion in Lumpinee Boxing Stadium.
When Attachai was 12 years old, his parents could no longer afford to provide for all 4 of their children. Seeing Attachai win all his fights in his hometown, his cousin saw potential in him and decided to bring him to Bangkok to train at Por Somranchai Gym to provide him with a better training environment and ease his family's financial strain.

Rising through the ranks
While in Bangkok, Attachai trained his hardest and fought his best. His desire to win soon made him a rising star in the Sukonesongchai promotions. 
Attachai fought his way up to the highest levels in the Rajadamnern and Lumpinee stadiums and fought many of the greatest Muay Thai fighters of his era including Saen Chai Sor Kingstar aka Saenchai PKSaenchai Gym, Samkor Kiatmontep, Khunpinit Kiattawan, Anuwat Kaewsamrit,<ref>{{cite web|url=https://www.youtube.com/watch?v=wawN5UYFui8|title=Attachai Fairtex vs Anuwat Kaewsamrit  R1|date=17 August 2011|publisher=YouTube}}</ref> Namsaknoi Yudthagarngamtorn, Lamnanoon Sor Sumalee, Chalermpon, Therdkiet, Kongpipop, Nopparat, Sakedpetch and Petmunkonk.

Transition to boxing
At 23 years old, Attachai made the switch to boxing. Under the instruction of Somluck Kamsing – the first Thai athlete to win a gold medal in the Olympics, Attachai competed in many Boxing tournaments; notably the Amateur Boxing Association of Thailand under the "Royal Patronage of His Majesty the King", in which he emerged as the champion.  He also represented the Royal Thai Police in the Kings Cup Boxing tournament – winning a silver.

Fighting internationally
When Attachai was 26 years old, he was bought over by the world-famous Fairtex camp to make his return to fighting in Muay Thai. Alongside training with Attachai were fighters such as Kaew Fairtex, Yodsanklai Fairtex and Naruepol Fairtex; who have all grew to become the biggest stars of Fairtex Gym, Pattaya.
Attachai represented Fairtex and won numerous fights in France, United States of America  and Japan. He won a total of 180 fights out of his 200 professional fights.

Life after fighting
Attachai retired from fighting at the age of 31 to become a full-time Muay Thai instructor. 
He first joined Kanomtom Gym Thailand as an instructor assisting in the fighters' training programmes. He was then invited to work in Florida at Tampa Muay Thai Gym, a sister company of Kanomtom Gym.
In 2011, Attachai was head hunted by Evolve Mixed Martial Arts (Singapore) – One of the largest martial arts gyms in Asia. Attachai worked alongside the other World Champion instructors at Evolve Mixed Martial Arts for 4 years.  
In 2015, Attachai left joined Trifecta Mixed Martial Arts as their Muay Thai instructor  and led their competition team.
Attachai now runs his own gym in Thailand – Attachai Muay Thai Gym.

Titles and accomplishments
Lumpinee Stadium
 1997 Lumpinee Stadium 122 lbs Champion
 1998 Lumpinee Stadium 130 lbs Champion
 1997 Lumpinee Stadium Fighter of the Year
 1998 Lumpinee Stadium Fighter of the Year
Rajadamnern Stadium
 Rajadamnern Stadium 112 lbs Champion
Professional Boxing Association of Thailand (PAT) 
 Thailand 108 lbs Champion
World Muay Thai Council
 WMC World 108 lbs Champion

Awards
1997 Sports Authority of Thailand Fighter of the Year

Muay thai record

|-  style="background:#fbb;"
| 2009-06-20 || Loss ||align=left| Sudsakorn Sor Klinmee ||Le Grand Défi ||Levallois-Perret, France || Decision || 5 || 3:00
|-  style="background:#cfc;"
| 2009-01-18 || Win||align=left|  Tsogto Amara || Muay Lok Japan 2009-The Greatest Muay Thai Festival-  || Tokyo, Japan || Decision (Unanimous) || 5 || 3:00
|-  style="background:#fbb;"
| 2008-2009 || Loss ||align=left| Diesellek TopkingBoxing || Rajadamnern Stadium|| Bangkok, Thailand || Decision || 5 || 3:00
|-  style="background:#cfc;"
| 2008-10-26 || Win ||align=left| Petchmankong Petchfergus || Lumpinee Stadium|| Bangkok, Thailand || Decision || 5 || 3:00
|-  style="background:#cfc;"
| 2008-10-03 || Win ||align=left| Therdkiet Kiatroengroed || Lumpinee Stadium || Bangkok, Thailand || Decision|| 5 || 3:00
|-  bgcolor="#cfc"
| 2008-06-12 || Win||align=left| Fabio Pinca || Gala de Levallois || Levallois-Perret, France || Decision || 5 || 3:00
|-  style="background:#cfc;"
| 2008-01-26 || Win ||align=left| Hassan Ait Bassou ||La Nuit Des Titans ||Tours, France || Decision || 3 || 3:00
|-  style="background:#cfc;"
| 2007-11-23 || Win ||align=left| Yohei Sakurai || NJKF FIGHTING　EVOLUTION XIII|| Tokyo, Japan || KO (Liver Kick) || 3 || 2:00
|-  bgcolor="#cfc"
| 2007-10-27 || Win||align=left| Fabio Pinca || One Night in Bangkok || Antwerp, Belgium || Decision || 5 || 3:00
|-  style="background:#cfc;"
| 2007-09-24 || Win ||align=left| Atsushi Suzuki ||M-1 MUAY THAI HEARTY SMILES || Japan || TKO || 4 || 1:14
|-  bgcolor="#cfc"
| 2007-06-16 || Win||align=left| Farid Khider || La Nuit des Superfights VIII || Paris, France || Decision || 3 || 3:00
|-  style="background:#cfc;"
| 2007-06-03 || Win ||align=left| Susumu Daiguji || M-1 FAIRTEX SINGHA BEER Muay Thai Challenge || Tokyo, Japan || TKO (Corner Stoppage) || 4 || 1:33
|-  style="background:#cfc;"
| 2007-04-20 || Win ||align=left| Kamel Jemel ||  Le défi des champions	 ||Levallois-Perret, France|| Decision || 5 || 3:00
|-  style="background:#fbb;"
| 2007-04-03 || Loss ||align=left| Singdam Kiatmuu9 || Lumpinee Stadium || Bangkok, Thailand || Decision || 5 || 3:00
|-  style="background:#cfc;"
| 2007-02-06 || Win||align=left| Kongpipop Petchyindee || Fairtex, Lumpinee Stadium || Bangkok, Thailand || Decision || 5||3:00
|-  style="background:#fbb;"
| 2006-11-17 || Loss ||align=left| Kongpipop Petchyindee || Gaiyanghadao Tournament, Semi Final || Nakhon Ratchasima, Thailand || KO || 2 ||
|-  style="background:#cfc;"
| 2006-11-17 || Win||align=left| Sakadpetch IngramGym || Gaiyanghadao Tournament, Quarter Final || Nakhon Ratchasima, Thailand || Decision || 3 || 3:00
|- |-  bgcolor="#CCFFCC"
| 2006-10-17|| Win ||align=left| Nopparat Keatkhamtorn || Lumpinee Stadium|| Bangkok, Thailand || KO || 4 || 0:48

|-  style="background:#cfc;"
| 2006-08-08 || Win||align=left| Singdam Kiatmuu9 || Fairtex, Lumpinee Stadium || Bangkok, Thailand || Decision || 5 || 3:00
|-  style="background:#cfc;"
| 2006-05-23 || Win||align=left| Kongpipop Petchyindee || Fairtex, Lumpinee Stadium || Bangkok, Thailand || Decision || 5||3:00

|-  bgcolor="#fbb"
| 2006-03-24 || Loss||align=left| Orono Wor Petchpun || Wanboonya , Lumpinee Stadium || Bangkok, Thailand || Decision  || 5 || 3:00
|-  style="background:#fbb;"
| 2006-02-10 || Loss||align=left| Singdam Kiatmuu9 || Lumpinee Stadium || Bangkok, Thailand || Decision || 5 || 3:00
|-  bgcolor="#fbb"
| 2005-12-20 || Loss||align=left| Nopparat Keatkhamtorn || Wanboonya, Lumpinee Stadium || Bangkok, Thailand || Decision|| 5 || 3:00
|-  bgcolor="#cfc"
| 2005-06-22 || Win||align=left| Anuwat Kaewsamrit || Kiatsingnoi, Rajadamnern Stadium || Bangkok, Thailand || Decision|| 5 || 3:00
|-  style="background:#cfc;"
| 2005-02-12 || Win ||align=left| Chalermpol Kiatsunanta || Onesongchai, Rajamagala Stadium|| Thailand || KO || 2 || 4:48
|-  style="background:#cfc;"
| 2004-12-29 || Win ||align=left| Klairung Sor.Chaicharoen || Onseongchai, Rajadamnern Stadium || Bangkok, Thailand || KO || 2 || 
|-  style="background:#fbb;"
| 2004-10-25 || Loss||align=left| Nongbee Kiatyongyut || Omnoi Stadium|| Samut Sakhon, Thailand || Decision|| 5 || 3:00
|-  style="background:#cfc;"
| 2004-09-11 || Win ||align=left| Khunpinit Kiettawan || Omnoi Stadium|| Bangkok, Thailand || Decision|| 5 || 3:00
|-  style="background:#cfc;"
| 2004 || Win ||align=left| Lamnamoon Sor.Sumalee || Lumpinee Stadium || Bangkok, Thailand || KO || 1 || 1:36

|-  style="background:#cfc;"
| 2002-09-26 || Win ||align=left| Sakawthong Phetnongnooch || Lumpinee Stadium|| Bangkok, Thailand|| KO || 4 || 3:00
|-  style="background:#fbb;"
| 2002-07-06 || Loss||align=left| Kamel Jemel ||  Le Grand Tournoi ||Paris, France|| Disqualification || 1 ||
|-  style="background:#fbb;"
| 2002-08-07 || Loss ||align=left| Saenchai Sor Kingstar || Lumpinee Stadium|| Bangkok, Thailand|| Decision|| 5 || 3:00
|-  style="background:#cfc;"
| 2002 || Win ||align=left| Rambojiew Por.Thubtim || Lumpinee Stadium|| Bangkok, Thailand|| KO || 4 || 3:00
|- style="background:#cfc;"
| 2002 || Win||align=left| Samkor Kiatmontep || Lumpinee Stadium || Bangkok, Thailand || Decision || 5 || 3:00
|-  style="background:#cfc;"
| 2002 || Win ||align=left| Namkabuan Nongkeepahuyuth || Lumpinee Stadium|| Bangkok, Thailand|| Decision || 5 || 3:00
|-  style="background:#c5d2ea;"
| 2002 || Draw ||align=left| Saenchai Sor Kingstar || Lumpinee Stadium|| Bangkok, Thailand || Decision || 5 || 3:00
|-  style="background:#cfc;"
| 2001-12-05 || Win ||align=left| Wang Jin Feng ||King's Birthday || Bangkok, Thailand || KO || 2 ||
|-  style="background:#cfc;"
| 2001 || Win ||align=left| Muangfalek Kiatvichian || Rajadamnern Stadium || Bangkok, Thailand|| Decision|| 5 || 3:00
|-  style="background:#cfc;"
| 2001-07-19 || Win ||align=left| Rambojiew Dongolfservice || Rajadamnern Stadium || Bangkok, Thailand|| KO || 4||
|-  style="background:#fbb;"
| 2001-04-05 || Loss ||align=left| Saenchai Sor.Kingstar|| Rajadamnern Stadium || Bangkok, Thailand || Decision || 5 || 3:00
|-  style="background:#cfc;"
| 2001-01-25 || Win ||align=left| Khunpit Kettawan || Rajadamnern Stadium || Bangkok, Thailand|| Decision|| 5 || 3:00
|- style="background:#fbb;"
| 2000-12-02 || Loss ||align=left| Samkor Ratchatasupak ||Lumpinee Stadium || Bangkok, Thailand || Decision || 5 || 3:00
|- style="background:#cfc;"
| 2000-09-09 || Win ||align=left| Therdkiat Kiatrungroj || Lumpinee Stadium || Bangkok, Thailand || Decision || 5 || 3:00
|-  style="background:#c5d2ea;"
| 2000- || Draw ||align=left|Saenchai Sor Kingstar || Lumpinee Stadium || Bangkok, Thailand || Decision || 5 || 3:00
|-  style="background:#cfc;"
| 2000 || Win ||align=left| Kochasan Singkongsi || Lumpinee Stadium|| Bangkok, Thailand|| Decision|| 5 || 3:00
|-  style="background:#cfc;"
| 2000-07-08 || Win ||align=left| Kamel Jemel ||  Muay Thai in Las Vegas ||Las Vegas, United States|| TKO ||3 ||
|-  style="background:#cfc;"
| 2000-06-02 || Win||align=left| Lamnamoon Sor.Sumalee || Lumpinee Stadium || Bangkok, Thailand || KO (Left Elbow)|| 3 ||
|-  style="background:#fbb;"
| 2000-04-04 || Loss||align=left|Saenchai Sor Kingstar || Lumpinee Stadium || Bangkok, Thailand || Decision || 5 || 3:00
|-  style="background:#cfc;"
| 2000-03-10 || Win ||align=left| Hideaki Suzuki || NJKF "Millennium Wars 2" || Japan || Decision (Unanimous) || 5 || 3:00
|-  style="background:#fbb;"
| 2000-03-03 || Loss||align=left|Saenchai Sor Kingstar || Lumpinee Stadium || Bangkok, Thailand || Decision || 5 || 3:00
|-  style="background:#cfc;"
| 2000 || Win ||align=left| Mathee Jadeepitak || Lumpinee Stadium|| Bangkok, Thailand|| Decision|| 5 || 3:00
|-  bgcolor="#c5d2ea"
| 2000-02-05 || Draw ||align=left| Namsaknoi Yudthagarngamtorn || Lumpinee Stadium || Bangkok, Thailand || Decision  || 5 || 3:00
|-  style="background:#;"
| 1999-12-17 || ||align=left| Chokdee Por.Pramuk ||  || Bangkok, Thailand|| ||  ||
|-  style="background:#fbb;"
| 1999-10-31 || Loss||align=left| Lamnamoon Sor.Sumalee ||  || Ubon Ratchathani, Thailand || Decision || 5 || 3:00
|-  style="background:#fbb;"
| 1999- || Loss ||align=left| Mathee Jadeepitak || Lumpinee Stadium || Bangkok, Thailand|| Decision|| 5 || 3:00
|- style="background:#fbb;"
| 1999-05-11 || Loss ||align=left| Khunsuk Phetsupaphan ||  || Bangkok, Thailand || Decision || 5||3:00
|-  style="background:#cfc;"
| 1999-03-26 || Win||align=left| Therdkiat Kiatrungroj || Lumpinee Stadium || Bangkok, Thailand|| Decision|| 5 || 3:00
|-
! style=background:white colspan=9 |
|- style="background:#;"
| 1999-02-10 || ||align=left| Samkor Chor.Rathchatasupak ||  Lumpinee Stadium || Bangkok, Thailand || || ||
|-  style="background:#cfc;"
| 1998-12-25 || Win ||align=left| Hideaki Suzuki || NJKF || Japan || Decision (Unanimous)|| 5 || 3:00
|- style="background:#fbb;"
| 1998-12-08 || Loss||align=left| Samkor Ratchatasupak || Lumpinee Stadium || Bangkok, Thailand || Decision || 5 || 3:00
|- style="background:#cfc;"
| 1998-10-26 || Win||align=left| Samkor Ratchatasupak || Rajadamnern Stadium || Bangkok, Thailand || Decision || 5 || 3:00
|- style="background:#cfc;"
| 1998-09-29 || Win ||align=left| Namkabuan Nongkeepahuyuth ||  Lumpinee Stadium || Bangkok, Thailand || Decision || 5 || 3:00
|-
! style=background:white colspan=9 |
|- style="background:#cfc;"
| 1998-08-07 || Win ||align=left| Namkabuan Nongkeepahuyuth ||  Lumpinee Stadium || Bangkok, Thailand || Decision || 5 || 3:00
|- style="background:#cfc;"
| 1998-06-26 || Win ||align=left|  Mathee Jadeepitak ||  Lumpinee Stadium || Bangkok, Thailand || Decision || 5 || 3:00
|- style="background:#cfc;"
| 1998- || Win ||align=left| Lamnamoon Sor.Sumalee ||  Rajadamnern Stadium || Bangkok, Thailand || Decision || 5 || 3:00
|- style="background:#cfc;"
| 1998-03-02 || Win ||align=left| Muangfahlek Kiatwichan ||  Rajadamnern Stadium || Bangkok, Thailand || Decision || 5 || 3:00
|- style="background:#fbb;"
| 1998-|| Loss ||align=left|  Mathee Jadeepitak ||  Lumpinee Stadium || Bangkok, Thailand || Decision || 5 || 3:00
|-  style="background:#cfc;"
| 1997-11-28 || Win ||align=left| Kotchasarn Singklongsi || Lumpinee Stadium || Bangkok, Thailand||Decision || 5 || 3:00
|-  style="background:#cfc;"
| 1997-09-19 || Win ||align=left| Rittichai Lookchaomaisathong || Lumpinee Stadium || Bangkok, Thailand|| Decision|| 5 || 3:00
|-
! style=background:white colspan=9 |
|-  style="background:#cfc;"
| 1997-05-23 || Win ||align=left| Baiphet Lookjaomesaiwaree || Lumpinee Stadium|| Bangkok, Thailand|| Decision|| 5 || 3:00
|-  style="background:#cfc;"
| 1997- || Win ||align=left| Sak-Ubon Por Muang Ubon || Lumpinee Stadium|| Bangkok, Thailand|| KO || 3 || 
|-  style="background:#cfc;"
| 1997- || Win ||align=left| Nueungsiam Fairtex || Lumpinee Stadium|| Bangkok, Thailand|| Decision|| 5 || 3:00
|-  style="background:#cfc;"
| 1997- || Win ||align=left| Pichai Wor.Walapon || Lumpinee Stadium|| Bangkok, Thailand|| Decision|| 5 || 3:00
|-  style="background:#;"
| 1996-07-08 || ||align=left| Sithichai Petchbangprang || Rajadamnern Stadium|| Bangkok, Thailand|| ||  ||
|-  style="background:#cfc;"
| 1995-12-11 || Win ||align=left| Kompayak Singmanee || Rajadamnern Stadium|| Bangkok, Thailand|| Decision|| 5 || 3:00
|-  style="background:#cfc;"
| 1995-11-13 || Win ||align=left| Kongkiat Sitchunthong || Rajadamnern Stadium|| Bangkok, Thailand|| Decision|| 5 || 3:00
|-  style="background:#cfc;"
| 1995-08-21 || Win ||align=left| Faphet Petchmuangwiset || Rajadamnern Stadium|| Bangkok, Thailand|| Decision|| 5 || 3:00
|-  style="background:#cfc;"
| 1995- || Win ||align=left| Saenkaeng Sor.Weerakul || Nimitbut Stadium World MT Champion ||Thailand || Decision|| 5 || 3:00
|-
! style=background:white colspan=9 |
|-  style="background:#cfc;"
| 1994- || Win ||align=left| Piatong Jocky Gym || Rajadamnern Stadium|| Bangkok, Thailand|| TKO || 4 || 3:00
|-  style="background:#cfc;"
| 1994 || Win ||align=left| Kompayak Singmanee || Rajadamnern Stadium|| Bangkok, Thailand|| Decision|| 5 || 3:00
|-  st-yle="background:#cfc;"
| 1994- || Win ||align=left| Fighter Plalungroup || Rajadamnern Stadium|| Bangkok, Thailand|| Decision|| 5 || 3:00
|-  style="background:#cfc;"
| 1994- || Win ||align=left| Kaewsod Sor Nowarat || Rajadamnern Stadium|| Bangkok, Thailand|| Decision|| 5 || 3:00
|-
| colspan=9 | Legend'':

References

Living people
Attachai Fairtex
Attachai Fairtex
1980 births
Attachai Fairtex